Iwaruna is a genus of moths in the family Gelechiidae.

Species
 Iwaruna biguttella (Duponchel, [1843])
 Iwaruna klimeschi Wolff, 1958
 Iwaruna heringi Gozmány, 1957
 Iwaruna robineaui Nel, 2008

Former species
 Iwaruna biformella (Schütze, 1902)

References

 
Anacampsini